Mitzic is a town located in Woleu-Ntem province, Gabon. Mitzic is located 322.71 km from Libreville, the capital of Gabon, and 111.47 km from Oyem, capital of Woleu Ntem.

History
The work of the late Moise Nkoghe Mvé, entitled The History of Mitzic, reports that Mitzic city was founded gradually between 1905 and 1910.

In 1947, Mitzic was the seat of a congress about the Fang culture and language, bringing together representatives of the Fang peoples from Gabon, Cameroon and Equatorial Guinea.

Demography

Languages

 French
 Fang

Geography

Neighborhoods 

 Atoute
 Edoung Allanga
Derrière l'aéroport
Derrière l’hôpital
 Etang

Villages 

 Ekouk
 Essong
 Mfoumou
 Sakeville
 Sam

Climate

 Distance to other cities 

 Nearby cities 

Oyem (111.47 km)
Medouneu (119.14 km)
Ndjolé (184.97 km)
Bitam (186.09 km)

 Distance to Capital 

Libreville,  largest city and capital of Gabon (322.71 km)
Oyem, Capital of Woleu-Ntem (111.47 km)

Religion

Saint Joseph Catholic Church
Protestant Church
Mosque

Education

Notable people

Jean Baptiste Ngomo Obiang
Jean Hilaire Mvomah
Moïse Nkoghe Mvé
Clément Obame

References

Populated places in Woleu-Ntem Province